Capuchin Church my stand for:

 Capuchin Church, Vienna
 Capuchin Church (Maribor)
 Church and Convent of Capuchins